Skenandoa (YTB-835) is a United States Navy  named for Oneida Chief Skenandoa. Skenandoa is the second US Navy ship to bear the name.

Design
The contract for Skenandoa was awarded 5 June 1973. She was laid down on 9 September 1974 at Marinette, Wisconsin, by Marinette Marine and launched 3 April 1975. She is 108 feet long, 29 feet wide, and has a draft of 14 feet. She displaces  when empty, and  when full. Her hull and superstructure are both made of steel. She is propelled by a diesel engine.

Operational history

Skenandoa initially was assigned to the 12th Naval District at San Francisco, California, aiding ships in berthing and docking maneuvers and providing waterfront fire protection. Sometime prior to October 2008, Skenandoa was transferred to Bremerton, Washington, where she is in active service. She has been given the National Defense Service Medal for her service.

References

External links
 

 

Natick-class large harbor tugs
Cold War auxiliary ships of the United States
Ships built by Marinette Marine
1975 ships